P. nitida may refer to:
 Passiflora nitida, the bell apple, a passion fruit species in Costa Rica, French Guiana and Brazil
 Pavoraja nitida, the peacock skate, a fish species
 Picralima nitida, the akuamma, a tree species found in West Africa

See also 
 Nitida (disambiguation)